Nikolay Nikolayevich Khrenkov (15 July 1984 – 2 June 2014) was a Russian bobsledder.

Career
Khrenkov's best World Cup finish was first in the four-man event at Park City, Utah in December 2010. He also finished second in a four-man World Cup race at Whistler Sliding Centre in February 2012. He was also a member of the four-man crew led by Alexandr Zubkov which won silver medals at the Bobsleigh European Championship in 2011 and 2012. Khrenkov competed for Russia at the 2014 Winter Olympics in the four-man bobsleigh event.

Khrenkov was killed in a car crash near the village of Podgorny on 2 June 2014.  He was on his way to see his  parents.  Khrenkov was 29.

References

External links
 
 
 
 

1984 births
2014 deaths
Russian male bobsledders
Bobsledders at the 2014 Winter Olympics
Olympic bobsledders of Russia
Road incident deaths in Russia